Haitham Simreen (born 7 February 1977) is a retired Jordanian footballer of Palestinian origin.

International goals

External links 
 
 

1977 births
Living people
Jordanian footballers
Jordan international footballers
Jordanian people of Palestinian descent
Association football defenders
Expatriate footballers in Yemen
Sportspeople from Amman